Zemianske Podhradie is a village and municipality in Nové Mesto nad Váhom District in the Trenčín Region of western Slovakia.

History
In historical records the village was first mentioned in 1397.

Geography
The municipality lies at an altitude of 248 metres and covers an area of 8.231 km2. It has a population of about 783 people.

References

External links

  Official page
https://web.archive.org/web/20071116010355/http://www.statistics.sk/mosmis/eng/run.html

Villages and municipalities in Nové Mesto nad Váhom District